The 11th Jutra Awards were held on March 29, 2009 to honour films made with the participation of the Quebec film industry in 2008. Nominations were announced on February 17.

Winners and nominees

References

2009 in Quebec
Jutra
11
Jutra